The following outline is provided as an overview of and topical guide to the Falkland Islands:

The Falkland Islands are an archipelago located in the South Atlantic Ocean on the Patagonian Shelf. The islands, a British Overseas Territory, enjoy a large degree of internal self-government with the United Kingdom guaranteeing good government and taking responsibility for their defence and foreign affairs.
The capital is Stanley on East Falkland.

Controversy exists over the Falklands' original discovery and subsequent colonisation by Europeans. At various times there have been French, British, Spanish, and Argentine settlements. Britain re-established its rule in 1833, though the islands continue to be claimed by Argentina. In 1982, following Argentina's invasion of the islands, the two-month-long undeclared Falklands War between both countries resulted in the surrender of all Argentine forces and the return of the islands to British administration.

The population, estimated at 2,841, primarily consists of native Falkland Islanders, the vast majority being of British descent. Other ethnicities include French, Gibraltarian, and Scandinavian. Immigration from the United Kingdom, Saint Helena, and Chile has reversed a former population decline. The predominant and official language is English. Under the British Nationality Act of 1983, Falkland Islanders are legally British citizens.

The islands are home to large bird populations, although many no longer breed on the main islands because of the effects of introduced species. Major economic activities include fishing, tourism, sheep farming with an emphasis on high-quality wool exports, and oil exploration. Oil exploration, licensed by the Falkland Islands Government, remains controversial as a result of maritime disputes with Argentina.

General reference

 Pronunciation: 
 Common English country names: The Falkland Islands, the Falklands
 Official English country name: The Falkland Islands
 Common endonym(s):  
 Official endonym(s):  
 Adjectival(s): Falkland Island
 Demonym(s): Falkland Islander, Falklander
 Etymology: Name of the Falkland Islands
 ISO country codes: FK, FLK, 238
 ISO region codes: See ISO 3166-2:FK
 Internet country code top-level domain: .fk

Geography of the Falkland Islands 

Geography of the Falkland Islands
 The Falkland Islands are: a British overseas territory and archipelago consisting of East Falkland,  West Falkland, and 776 smaller islands
 Location:
 Southern Hemisphere and Western Hemisphere
 Atlantic Ocean
 Time zone: UTC-4, September–April UTC-3
 Extreme points of the Falkland Islands
 High:  Mount Usborne 
 Low:  South Atlantic Ocean 0 m
 Land boundaries:  none
 Coastline:  1,288 km
 Population of the Falkland Islands: 

 Area of the Falkland Islands: 
 Atlas of the Falkland Islands

Environment of the Falkland Islands 

 Climate of the Falkland Islands
 Geology of the Falkland Islands
 Wildlife of the Falkland Islands
 Fauna of the Falkland Islands
 Birds of the Falkland Islands
 Mammals of the Falkland Islands

Natural geographic features of the Falkland Islands 

 Islands of the Falkland Islands
 Mountains of the Falkland Islands
 Rivers of the Falkland Islands
 Valleys of the Falkland Islands
 World Heritage Sites in the Falkland Islands: None
Patagonian Shelf
Burdwood Bank

Regions of the Falkland Islands 

Regions of the Falkland Islands

Ecoregions of the Falkland Islands 

List of ecoregions in the Falkland Islands

Administrative divisions of the Falkland Islands

Municipalities of the Falkland Islands 

 Capital of the Falkland Islands: Stanley
 Cities of the Falkland Islands

Demography of the Falkland Islands 

Demographics of the Falkland Islands

Government and politics of the Falkland Islands 

Politics of the Falkland Islands
 Form of government: parliamentary representative democratic dependency
 Capital of the Falkland Islands: Stanley
 Elections in the Falkland Islands
 1949 Falkland Islands general election
 1952 Falkland Islands general election
 1956 Falkland Islands general election
 1960 Falkland Islands general election
 1964 Falkland Islands general election
 1968 Falkland Islands general election
 1971 Falkland Islands general election
 1976 Falkland Islands general election
 1977 Falkland Islands general election
 1981 Falkland Islands general election
 1985 Falkland Islands general election
 1989 Falkland Islands general election
 1993 Falkland Islands general election
 1997 Falkland Islands general election
 2001 Falkland Islands general election
 2005 Falkland Islands general election
 2009 Falkland Islands general election
 2013 Falkland Islands general election
 2017 Falkland Islands general election
 2021 Falkland Islands general election
 Referendums in the Falkland Islands
 1986 Falkland Islands status referendum
 2001 Falkland Islands electoral system referendum
 2011 Falkland Islands electoral system referendum
 2013 Falkland Islands sovereignty referendum
 2020 Falkland Islands electoral system referendum
 List of Falkland Islands by-elections
 Political parties in the Falkland Islands

Branches of the government of the Falkland Islands 

Government of the Falkland Islands

Executive branch of the government of the Falkland Islands 
 Head of state: Monarch of the United Kingdom, Charles III
 Monarch's representative: Governor of the Falkland Islands, Alison Blake
 Head of government: Chief Executive of the Falkland Islands, Andy Keeling
 Cabinet: Executive Council of the Falkland Islands
 3 members elected by the Legislative Assembly
 2 ex officio members
 the Chief Executive
 the Director of Finance
 the Governor

Legislative branch of the government of the Falkland Islands 
 Legislative Assembly of the Falkland Islands (unicameral)
 Speaker: Keith Biles

Judicial branch of the government of the Falkland Islands 

Court system of the Falkland Islands
 Privy Council of the United Kingdom
 Falkland Islands Court of Appeal
 Supreme Court of the Falkland Islands
 Magistrate's Court of the Falkland Islands
 Summary Court of the Falkland Islands

Foreign relations of the Falkland Islands 

Foreign relations of the Falkland Islands
 None - though self-governing, the Falkland Islands are an overseas territory of the United Kingdom, and therefore all foreign relations in regards to it are conducted by the UK.  See also Sovereignty of the Falkland Islands.
 Diplomatic missions in the Falkland Islands: none
 Diplomatic missions of the Falkland Islands: none

International organization membership 
The government of the Falkland Islands is a member of:
Universal Postal Union (UPU)

Law and order in the Falkland Islands 

Law of the Falkland Islands
 Constitution of the Falkland Islands
 Crime in the Falkland Islands
 Human rights in the Falkland Islands
 LGBT rights in the Falkland Islands
 Law enforcement in the Falkland Islands

Military of the Falkland Islands 

Military of the Falkland Islands
 Command
 Commander-in-chief:
 Forces
 Army of the Falkland Islands
 Navy of the Falkland Islands
 Air Force of the Falkland Islands
 Military history of the Falkland Islands
 Military ranks of the Falkland Islands

Local government in the Falkland Islands 

Local government in the Falkland Islands

History of the Falkland Islands 

History of the Falkland Islands
 Timeline of the history of the Falkland Islands
 Current events of the Falkland Islands
 Falklands War
 Military history of the Falkland Islands

Culture of the Falkland Islands 

Culture of the Falkland Islands
 Architecture of the Falkland Islands
 Humour in the Falkland Islands
 Languages of the Falkland Islands
 National symbols of the Falkland Islands
 Coat of arms of the Falkland Islands
 Flag of the Falkland Islands
 National anthem of the Falkland Islands
 People of the Falkland Islands
 Public holidays in the Falkland Islands
 Religion in the Falkland Islands
 Sikhism in the Falkland Islands
 World Heritage Sites in the Falkland Islands: None

Art in the Falkland Islands 
 Music of the Falkland Islands

Sports in the Falkland Islands 

Sports in the Falkland Islands
 Football in the Falkland Islands

Economy and infrastructure of the Falkland Islands 

Economy of the Falkland Islands
 Economic rank, by nominal GDP (2007): 223rd (two hundred and twenty third)
 Falkland Islands Development Corporation
 Communications in the Falkland Islands
 Internet in the Falkland Islands
 Companies of the Falkland Islands
Currency of the Falkland Islands: Pound
ISO 4217: FKP
 Tourism in the Falkland Islands
 Transport in the Falkland Islands
 Airports in the Falkland Islands
 Rail transport in the Falkland Islands

Education in the Falkland Islands 

Education in the Falkland Islands

See also 

Falkland Islands
Index of Falkland Islands-related articles
List of Falkland Islands-related topics
List of international rankings
Outline of geography
Outline of South America
Outline of the United Kingdom

References

External links

 
 
 Falkland Islands Government official site
 The Falkland Islands Tourist Board
 Falkland Islands Tourism
 Falkland Islands Development Corporation official site
 Falkland Islands News Network official site
 Falkland Islands Information Portal
 Thoughts on the Late Transactions Respecting Falkland's Islands by Samuel Johnson 1771

Falkland Islands